Big Spring High School is a public high school located in Big Spring, Texas and classified as a 4A Division I school by the University Interscholastic League (UIL).  It is part of the Big Spring Independent School District located in north central Howard County.  The high school building was dedicated on March 23, 1952.  The dedication address was given by J.W. Edgar, State Commissioner of Education.  This was the first new high school built in 35 years, and the third in the districts history.   In 2015, the school was rated "Met Standard" by the Texas Education Agency.

UIL Academic Events
The Big Spring Steers compete in the following UIL Academic Events - 
Events below have both team and individual components unless specifically noted otherwise. Sanctioned high school academic events are:
 
Accounting
Calculator Applications
Computer Applications (individual competition only)
Computer Science
Congressional Debate
Current Issues and Events
Literary Criticism
Mathematics
Number Sense
Ready Writing (individual competition only)
Science
Social Studies
Spelling and Vocabulary
Speech (an award is given to the top overall school in speech events; the award does not qualify students for advancement)
Cross-Examination Team Debate (team competition only)
Lincoln-Douglas Debate (individual competition only)
Extemporaneous Speaking (individual competition only)
Poetry Interpretation (individual competition only)
Prose Interpretation (individual competition only)
Congressional Debate
Journalism (an award is given to the top overall school in journalism events; the award does not qualify students for advancement)
Editorial Writing (individual competition only)
Feature Writing (individual competition only)
Headline Writing (individual competition only)
News Writing (individual competition only)
one act play (team competition plus individual awards that do not lead to advancement)

UIL Academic State Meet

State Titles
Individual

Calculator Applications 
2022 (4A)
Congressional Debate 
2016 (4A)
Editorial Writing 
1990(4A)
Feature Writing 
2008(4A)
Lincoln-Douglas Debate 
2005(4A), 2011(3A), 2015(4A), 2016(4A) 
Mathematics 
2022 (4A)
News Writing 
1990, 2009(4A)
Number Sense 
2009(4A)
Persuasive Speaking 
2011(3A)
Prose Interpretation 
1978(4A), 1979(4A)
Spelling 
1977(4A), 2001(4A)
Typing 
1948(2A)

Team

Journalism 
2004(4A), 2009(4A)
Speech 
2016 (4A)

Other State Placings
1947
 3rd Place Shorthand
1990
2nd Place News Writing
2002
Octa-Finalists: Cross-Examination Debate
2003
3rd Place Persuasive Extemporaneous Speaking
2004
2nd Place Persuasive Extemporaneous Speaking
2nd Place: Headline Writing
2nd Place:  News Writing
3rd Place: Lincoln-Douglas Debate
4th Place: News Writing
6th Place Informative Extemporaneous Speaking
2005
3rd Place Persuasive Extemporaneous Speaking
3rd Place: Feature Writing
6th Place Poetry Interpretation
2006
Quarter-Finalists: Cross-Examination Debate
2009
2nd Place: Feature Writing
3rd Place: Headline Writing
3rd Place: Literary Criticism
2010
3rd Place Persuasive Extemporaneous Speaking
Octa-Finalists: Cross-Examination Debate
2012
3rd Place Lincoln-Douglas Debate
2014
Octafinalist Cross-examination Debate
5th Place Speaker, Cross-examination State Meet
3rd Place Informative Extemporaneous Speaking
3rd Place Lincoln-Douglas Debate
 4th Place Informative Extemporaneous Speaking
2015
5th Place Congressional Debate 4A
4th Place Editorial Writing
5th Place Ready Writing
5th Place Persuasive Extemporaneous Speaking
2016
2nd Place Congressional Debate 4A
3rd Place Cross-examination Debate 4A
Bronze Gavel Speaker, Cross-Examination State Meet
2nd Place News Writing 4A
2nd Place Persuasive Speaking 4A
3rd Place Persuasive Speaking 4A
5th Place Editorial Writing 4A
2017
Octafinalist Cross-Examination State Meet 4A
 3rd Place Ready Writing 4A
3rd Place Informative Speaking
4th Place Editorial Writing 4A
2019
Octafinalist Cross-Examination State Meet 4A
2021
5th Place Linconln-Douglas Debate
2nd Place Calculator Applications
4th Place Spelling & Vocabulary
2022
Quarter-Finalist Cross-Examination State Meet 4A
5th Place Speaker Cross-Examination
2nd Place Persuasive Speaking 4A
5th Place Spelling and Vocabulary 4A
6th Place Informative Speaking 4A
2nd Place Spelling and Vocabulary Team 4A

Athletics
The Big Spring Steers compete in these sports - 

Cross Country, Volleyball, Football, Basketball, Powerlifting, Swimming, Golf, Tennis, Track, Softball & Baseball

The school competes in class 4A in all sports except for swimming and diving which competes in class 5A

State Titles

Team

Boys Cross Country - 
2006(4A)

Individual

Boys Triple Jump - 
2010(4A)
Girls Long Jump - 
2011(3A)
Boys 800 Meter - 
2016 (4A)
Boys 800 Meter - 
2017 (4A)
Girls Triple Jump - 
2017 (4A)

State Finalists
Football - 
1953(3A) 
Baseball - 
1994(4A)

State Semi-Finalists
Volleyball - 
2013 (3A)

Other State Placings

2011 Girls Track 2nd Place team
2011(3A)
2nd Place Girls Long Jump
2nd Place Boys Long Jump
2nd Place Girls 400 Relay
2nd Place Girls 800 Relay
3rd Place Triple Jump
2012(3A)
9th Place Boys Powerlifting SHW
2017 (4A)
2nd Place Boys 1600 Relay
4th Place Boys 400 Meter
5th Place Boys 300 Hurdles
6th Place Boys 400 Relay
6th Place Boys 800 Relay
4th Place Girls 400 Meter
4th Place Girls Discus

Notable alumni

Larry Arnhart- writer and scholar, graduated from Big Spring High School in 1967.
Dan Birdwell - defensive tackle for the Oakland Raiders
Ken Coffey - safety for the Washington Redskins
Olie Cordill - halfback for the Cleveland Rams
Jim Evans - wide receiver for the New York Jets
Bob Flowers - center for the Green Bay Packers
Bubba Franks - Green Bay Packers tight end; although born in California, was raised and played high school football in Big Spring.
Tony Franklin - Philadelphia Eagles, New England Patriots, Miami Dolphins; barefoot kicker set 18 NCAA records playing at Texas A&M, He led the NFL in scoring (140 points) and field goals made (32) in 1986 and was selected to represent the AFC in the Pro Bowl. Played in Super Bowl XV and Super Bowl XX
Charley Johnson - quarterback for the St. Louis Cardinals
Cliff Patton - guard for the Philadelphia Eagles
Stephan Pyles - Chef and  restaurateur.  Owner of Stephan Pyles, Samar, and Stampede 66 in Dallas.
J. T. Smith — wide receiver for the St. Louis and Phoenix Cardinals, Washington Redskins and Kansas City Chiefs. Played 13 years in the NFL, then coached the San Angelo indoor team. Played at North Texas State after finishing at Big Spring High School. He was inducted to the Big Spring Hall of Fame and in 2002. JT was named to the AFC Pro Bowl team in 1980 and the NFC Pro Bowl team in 1988. He also led the NFL in total punt returns in 1979 & 1980.
Ryan Tannehill - quarterback for the Tennessee Titans
Charlie West - safety for the Minnesota Vikings

References

External links
Big Spring ISD

Public high schools in Texas
Schools in Howard County, Texas
1952 establishments in Texas
Educational institutions established in 1952